Scarcroft Primary School is a coeducational primary school housed in a grade II* listed building on Moss Street, just south-west of the city centre of York, in England.

In 1895, the York School Board leased the Victoria Bar Primitive Methodist Connexion mission room on Nunnery Lane, for the education of 150 children.  In August 1896, this was replaced by the newly built Scarcroft Road Board School, at the north-eastern end of Micklegate Stray.  The school was designed to accommodate 1,200 children in 21 classrooms and two halls.  Numbers grew slowly, with only 168 children enrolled in 1897, reaching 1,175 by 1910.  At the time, it accommodated both primary and secondary age pupils.  After World War II, the senior section ceased accepting girls, and the building was divided between Scarcroft County Primary School and Scarcroft Secondary Modern Boys School.

The building was designed by Walter Brierley, and Nikolaus Pevsner describes it as "his masterpiece", with "one of the most striking and original elevations in York".  It is in the Queen Anne style.

The building is built of brick.  The central part of the building, the hall range, is of two tall stories, and there are wings either side, of three stories, with attics.  At both ends of the wings, smaller wings project.  The hall is lit by three large windows, and there are corner turrets on its roof.  There is also a central clock tower.  Most of the windows are original, and the interior also retains many original fixtures and fittings.

The building was grade II* listed in 1968.  The playground walls, gates and railings, also designed by Brierley, were grade II listed in 1997.

In 2017, the school was refurbished, with two extra classrooms added in the existing building.  Part of the car park was converted into an additional playground.  In 2022, the school had 384 pupils aged between 4 and 11.  It is part of the South Bank Multi-Academy Trust.

References

External links

Buildings and structures completed in 1896
Grade II* listed buildings in York
Primary schools in York
Academies in York
Educational institutions established in 1896
1896 establishments in England